William Hood Walrond, 1st Baron Waleran,  (26 February 1849 – 17 May 1925), known as Sir William Walrond, Bt, between 1889 and 1905, of Bradfield House, Uffculme, Devon, was a British Conservative Party politician who sat in the House of Commons from 1880 until 1906 when he was raised to the peerage. He served as Parliamentary Secretary to the Treasury between 1895 and 1902 and as Chancellor of the Duchy of Lancaster between 1902 and 1905.

Background
Walrond was the son of Sir John Walrond, 1st Baronet of Bradfield House, Uffculme, Devon and the Hon. Frances Caroline Hood, youngest daughter of Samuel Hood, 2nd Baron Bridport. He was educated at Eton and served as a captain in the Grenadier Guards in 1872. He was Lieutenant-Colonel commanding the 1st (Exeter and South Devon) Devonshire Rifle Volunteer Corps from 9 June 1877, and a J.P. and DL for Devon.

Cricket
Walrond was also an active cricketer. He was in the Eton first XI in 1866 and 1867 and played for numerous amateur teams for many years subsequently including Quidnuncs, I Zingari, Gentlemen of Devon and Marylebone Cricket Club. He played one game for MCC in 1868 which was classified as first-class.

Political career

Walrond was elected as a Member of Parliament (MP) for East Devonshire in the 1880 general election and held the seat until 1885 when it was replaced under the Redistribution of Seats Act 1885. In the 1885 general election he was elected MP for Tiverton which he held until 1906. Walrond served as a Junior Lord of the Treasury from 1885 to 1886 under Lord Salisbury, and from 1886 to 1892 under Salisbury and then under Arthur Balfour. He was Parliamentary Secretary to the Treasury and Chief Whip under Balfour from 1895 to 1902 and Chancellor of the Duchy of Lancaster from 11 August 1902 to 1905. He was sworn of the Privy Council in 1899.

In 1889 he succeeded his father in the baronetcy and in 1905 he was raised to the peerage as Baron Waleran, of Uffculme in the County of Devon.

Family
Walrond's sister, Mary Caroline Walrond, married firstly Lt.-Col. Sir George Clay, 3rd Bt., and secondly Lt.-Col. Walter Henry Holbech. Her son from her second marriage was William Holbech, who, like his uncle, played first-class cricket.

Walrond married twice, first in 1871 Elizabeth Katharine Pitman; after her death in October 1911 he married secondly in 1913 Helene Margaret Morrison, daughter of F. Morrison. There were children by the first marriage:
Hon. Evelyn Maud Walrond, OBE (1872–1944); married at Bradfield, Collumpton, Devon on 27 August 1901 George Russell Northcote, a descendant of the Earls of Iddesleigh.
John Neville Hood Walrond (26 Nov 1874 – 30 Dec 1902), who did unmarried at Sanremo 28 years old in 1902.
Hon. William Lionel Charles Walrond (1876–1915), succeeded his father as Member of Parliament for Tiverton but was killed in action in the First World War. His son succeeded to the title.
Hon. Dorothy Katherine Walrond (d.1952); married in 1897 Arthur Robert Pyers Southwell, 5th Viscount Southwell (1872–1944), and left children including later Viscounts Southwell.

Lord Waleran died in May 1925, aged 76, and was succeeded in his titles by his grandson, William. Lady Waleran died in February 1956.

References

External links 
 

Waleran, William Walrond, 1st Baron
Waleran, William Walrond, 1st Baron
People educated at Eton College
Waleran, William Walrond, 1st Baron
Waleran, William Walrond, 1st Baron
Conservative Party (UK) MPs for English constituencies
Chancellors of the Duchy of Lancaster
English justices of the peace
Waleran, William Walrond, 1st Baron
English cricketers
Marylebone Cricket Club cricketers
UK MPs 1880–1885
UK MPs 1885–1886
UK MPs 1886–1892
UK MPs 1892–1895
UK MPs 1895–1900
UK MPs 1900–1906
UK MPs who were granted peerages
Volunteer Force officers
Deputy Lieutenants of Devon
Members of the Parliament of the United Kingdom for East Devon
Peers created by Edward VII